The Imam Reza Stadium (Vârzeshgah-e Emam Reza) is an all-seated football stadium located in Mashhad, Iran. The stadium has a seating capacity of 27,700 and is the sixth biggest stadium in Iran. It hosts some matches of the Iran national football team. The stadium completed in January 2017 and was opened on 14 March 2017 on the day of Chaharshanbe Suri.

The stadium is in an area of Mashhad that belongs to the Astan Quds Razavi (AQR), a charitable foundation which manages the Imam Reza shrine. The stadium is located in the eastern side of the  AQR Sports Complex and has a  area. In addition to the football stadium, the complex has ten sport salons including tennis, basketball and volleyball arenas, swimming pools and water collection. The complex also has amphitheater, conference hall, dining hall, museum and coaching classes.

History and design
Mashhad Imam Reza Stadium is one of the most modern stadiums in Iran. The stadium is designed by Iranian architect Masoud Ziae.

The preliminary steps for building a new football stadium in Mashhad started in 2011. Astan Quds Razavi (AQR) had planned to build a big sport complex to develop the sport in Mashhad. The Football Federation of Iran also asked AQR to build a new modern football stadium to host some matches of Iran national football team and Hazfi Cup finals. The stadium broke ground on 5 March 2013 and was planned to finish in mid-June 2016 but it delayed until January 2017. The stadium was set to open on 26 March 2016, during Iranian traditional ceremonies of Nowruz, but was postponed. The stadium was finally opened one year later on 14 March 2017 at the day of Chaharshanbe Suri.

The stadium is named after Imam  Ali al-Ridha, a descendant of the Prophet Muhammad and the eighth Shi'ite Imam.

Structure and facilities
The stadium's roof has been designed by the German Company EFA Ingenieure GmbH and built by Freyssinet, a French company that has worked in the London Olympic Stadium and some of the 2014 FIFA World Cup venues. The stadium seats were supplied by Daplast, a Spanish company. The company has a contract with Real Madrid. The natural grass and tartan track along the side is in the hands of a German company which also has contracts with several large stadiums in Germany.

14 halls under the platforms of the stadium are ready for operation. The car park with a capacity of 5000 cars is being built.

The stadium has a Grade A in Asia by the Asian Football Confederation (AFC). Previously, only the Azadi Stadium in Tehran has been grade A among stadiums in Iran.

There are two gymnastics halls for men and women, two gyms, martial arts, table tennis, games, education, health and beauty, as well as conference halls, museums and collections of sports memorabilia, conference hall, medical clinic, buffet and natural turf soccer fields are among the other facilities in the complex. The cost of the gyms were 11 billion Iranian Rial.

Development
Operations, including excavation and concrete structure, were set in a three-phase schedule, The first phase included excavation operations and the implementation of the concrete skeleton on the east side. The second phase of the project included construction of the northern concrete skeleton. The final concrete structures will be constructed at the end of the third phase of the project. The sport halls of the first and second phases are nearing completion.

Transport Connections

Imam Reza Stadium lies on central parts of Mashhad and is situated near Khayyam Subway Station and Khayyam sq. BRT station.

Nearby public transportation stations:

International Matches
Iran National Football Team

See also

Football in Iran
Samen Stadium

References

Buildings and structures in Mashhad
Football venues in Iran
Sports venues completed in 2017
Sport in Razavi Khorasan Province